U.C. Sampdoria won its second cup trophy in just three years, defeating Torino in the final, thanks to a 3-2 aggregate victory. Gianluca Vialli scored ten goals to become club top scorer, as Sampdoria finished fourth in the domestic league.

Squad

Goalkeepers
  Gianluca Pagliuca
  Guido Bistazzoni

Defenders
  Moreno Mannini
  Pietro Vierchowod
  Luca Pellegrini
  Fausto Pari
  Antonio Paganin
  Michele Zanutta
  Hans-Peter Briegel

Midfielders
  Marco Lanna
  Toninho Cerezo
  Luca Fusi
  Fausto Salsano
  Fulvio Bonomi

Attackers
  Roberto Mancini
  Gianluca Vialli
  Marco Branca

Serie A

League table

Matches

Coppa Italia

First Round 
Group 7

Eightfinals

Quarterfinals

Semifinals

Final

First leg

Second leg

Sampdoria won 3–2 on aggregate.

References

U.C. Sampdoria seasons
Sampdoria